The North-South Cup was a short-lived all-Ireland football tournament. It was played for two seasons in the 1960s and on both occasions won by teams from Northern Ireland.

The 1960-61 competition was played to the semi-final stage, however due to fixture congestion the final had to be held over to the following season.  Similarly the 1961-62 competition could not be finished in time, the first round and part of the second round were played during the season, however the rest was completed during the 1962–63 season.

Finals

References

External links
 North-South Cup at the Irish Football Club Project
 Irish League Archive - North-South Cup

Defunct all-Ireland association football cup competitions
1960–61 in Republic of Ireland association football
1961–62 in Republic of Ireland association football
1960–61 in Northern Ireland association football
1961–62 in Northern Ireland association football